Delhi Waqf Board is a state level statuary body under the Delhi Government under Wakf Act 1954. It exercises control over mosques, graveyards and relegious waqfs. The primary function of Wakf Board is to insure its properties and revenue are appropriately managed and utilized.

In The News
In an RTI filed by Ajay Bose, it was revealed that Delhi Waqf Board had received over 100 crores in 7 years from Delhi Government as Grant in Aid.

Chairman

There are 7 members in the present Board:-

Mr. Amanatullah Khan (Chairman)

Mr. Himal Akhtar (member)

Mr. Azimul Haque (member)

Mr. Parvez hashmimember)

Mr. Ch. Shareef Ahmad (member)

Ms. Naeem Fatima Kazmi (member)

Ms. Razia Sultana (member).

The current Chairman of Delhi Waqf Board is Amanatullah Khan.

Election of Chairperson

The members are nominated from different quotas, for e.g mutawalli (caretaker) Quota, MLA/MP Quota and Bar Council Quota. In total there are at least 6 members. After the appointment of members of a newly constituted Board notified under section 13, the state Government shall, as soon as may arrange to fix, by giving to the members not less than ten clear day’s notice, a date for the first meeting of the Board which shall be for the election of chairman.

References

Organisations based in Delhi
Religious organisations based in India